The Confederate Powderworks (a.k.a. the Augusta Powderworks) was a gunpowder factory during the American Civil War, the only permanent structures completed by the Confederate States of America. Colonel George Washington Rains chose the old United States Arsenal site between the Canal and Savannah River in Augusta, Georgia, as a secure inland location with good rail and water connections.

History
Rains graduated from West Point with the class of 1842 and served as a chemistry teacher for the Military Academy. He had resigned to become president of an iron works in Newburgh, New York. At the start of the Civil War he chose allegiance to his native North Carolina and returned to the south. He was placed in charge of the Gunpowder and Niter Bureau by Jefferson Davis the president of the Confederacy.

Construction began in September 1861, a 130 hp steam engine was purchased from the Atlanta flour mill owned by Richard Peters and the Powderworks was producing gunpowder in just 7 months in 1862. Rains was guided by a pamphlet written by a British artillery officer describing the powder works at Waltham Abbey in Essex County near London, and also found someone who had worked there to advise him.  

As was customary for gunpowder mills, the buildings were separated and designed to survive explosions, with raw materials starting at one end, and the finished powder ending a mile and a half away at the other end. 

The saltpeter refinery building was the largest, and was designed in Gothic style as a replica of the British Houses of Parliament. 

The Confederate Powderworks was the second largest gunpowder factory in the world at that time, 1862-1865, during the 19th century, producing 3.5 tons a day. More than 2.75 million pounds of first-quality gunpowder (a majority of the powder used by the Confederacy), was produced here before its closure on April 18, 1865. By comparison, Union gunpowder manufacture was distributed among many mills, with the larger Hazard Powder Company of Connecticut producing forty percent of the annual production of 8.4 million pounds.

It has been said the Confederacy never lost a battle for lack of powder.

Although the massive works were seized and dismantled after the war ended, the commandant, Colonel G.W. Rains, asked in 1872, that the Obelisk Chimney be spared as he had designed it to "... remain a monument to the Confederacy should the Powderworks pass away". On June 2, 1879, the city of Augusta gave custody of the Chimney to the Confederate Survivors Association of Augusta to "beautify it and protect it from injury as a Confederate Memorial". The CSA of Augusta repaired the square castellated base, protected the corners and in the face, looking towards the canal inserted a large tablet of Italian marble, bearing this inscription: "This Obelisk Chimney — sole remnant of the extensive Powder Works here erected under the auspices of the Confederate Government — is by the Confederate Survivors' Association of Augusta, with the consent of the City Council, conserved in Honor of a fallen Nation, and inscribed to the memory of those who died in the Southern Armies during the War Between the States".

Today
The 150 foot Powderworks chimney still stands on the Augusta Canal and is one of the more recognizable features of the Augusta skyline today, located at the Sibley Mill at 1717 Goodrich Street in Augusta. The Sibley cotton mill was built on the site as a private venture in 1880–82, using bricks from the demolished powder works, and became one of the largest and most successful cotton mills in the region, a model of good management and worker relations.  It manufactured denim until 2006, and the mill's water-driven turbines still generate electricity which is sold to Georgia Power.

The chimney is the only remaining portion of the original Works. The B/G E. Porter Alexander Camp #158, Sons of Confederate Veterans, spent eight years raising $192,000 to restore the chimney with its historical marker; work started on November 19, 2009, and was completed on March 12, 2010.  A rededication ceremony was held on Oct. 9, 2010.

References

Confederate States of America monuments and memorials in Georgia
Manufacturing plants in the United States
Georgia (U.S. state) in the American Civil War
1861 establishments in the Confederate States of America
1865 disestablishments in the Confederate States of America
Landmarks in Georgia (U.S. state)
Buildings and structures in Augusta, Georgia
Tourist attractions in Augusta, Georgia
Military installations in Georgia (U.S. state)
Augusta Canal National Heritage Area
Gunpowder mills